Rafael Luis Bardají López (born Badajoz, 1959) is a Spanish author, sociologist and former national security advisor to the Spanish government who researches the fields of neoconservatism and international politics. He was the founder of the Grupo de Estudios Estratégicos (Strategic Studies Group) think-tank.

Biography
Bardaji graduated with degrees in political science and sociology from the Complutense University of Madrid (UCM). He became a researcher into American neoconservative politics under the George W. Bush administration and the 2003 Invasion of Iraq. Along with other academics, military figures and politicians, he founded the centre-right Strategic Studies Group which aims to provide research on defense and security. The group maintains informal ties to the Spanish People's Party. Bardaji also worked as a policy advisor to People's Party defense ministers Eduardo Serra Rexach and Federico Trillo. Bardaji has also written in support of Israel and is a member of the  Friends of Israel Initiative in Spain.

In 2018, Bardaji announced he had ended his longstanding affiliation to the People's Party and had joined Vox. Italian journalist Steven Forti argued that Bardaji's role in Vox as being "the main channel that has put the Vox leaders in contact with the American neocon world."

Views
Bardaji has described himself as a Zionist and a supporter of Israel. He is critical of Islam and has argued that Islamic teachings have been responsible for terrorism and that non-violent passages in Islam still encourage intolerance. In 2015, he claimed that contrary to other opinions, Islamic state could not be defined as a typical terrorist outfit as it was a generating support via an apparatus of security and order in comparison to the government of Syria.

References

Bibliography 
 
 
 
 
 
 
 
 

1959 births
Spanish writers
Spanish sociologists
Conservatism in Spain
Vox (political party) politicians
People's Party (Spain) politicians
Anti-Islam sentiment in Spain
Spanish Zionists
Living people
Complutense University of Madrid alumni
Politicians from Extremadura
People from Badajoz